A number of icebreakers have been named Ilya Muromets after the Russian folk hero:

 Ilya Muromets, a 1915-built steam-powered icebreaker later captured by the French
 Ilya Muromets, a former German icebreaker Eisbär that was handed over to the Soviet Union as war reparations in 1946
 Ilya Muromets, a Project 97K icebreaker built in 1965
 Ilya Muromets, Russian Navy icebreaker launched in 2016

Ship names